Anomoeotes separatula is a species of moth of the Anomoeotidae family. It is known from Equatorial Guinea.

References

Anomoeotidae
Moths of Africa
Moths described in 1913